Al Ameen Memorial Minority College, established in 2004, is an undergraduate co-educational college at Jogibattala,  Baruipur, South 24 Parganas district . This is the first Muslim Minority General Degree College in West Bengal. This college is affiliated to the University of Calcutta.

Departments

Arts
Bengali
English
Arabic
Islamic History & Culture
Urdu
History
Philosophy
Education

Accreditation
Al Ameen Memorial Minority College is recognized by the University Grants Commission (UGC).

See also 
List of colleges affiliated to the University of Calcutta
Education in India
Education in West Bengal

References

External links
http://www.ammcollege.org

Educational institutions established in 2004
University of Calcutta affiliates
Universities and colleges in South 24 Parganas district
2004 establishments in West Bengal